Sudhir Kumar Giri was an Indian politician belonging to the Communist Party of India (Marxist). He was elected to the Lok Sabha the lower house of Indian Parliament from Contai constituency, West Bengal in 1980,1989,1991,1996 and 1998.He was elected to the West Bengal Legislative assembly from Ramnagar, Purba Medinipur (Vidhan Sabha constituency) in 1987.

References

External links
Official biographical sketch in Parliament of India website

1933 births
Lok Sabha members from West Bengal
India MPs 1980–1984
India MPs 1989–1991
India MPs 1991–1996
India MPs 1996–1997
India MPs 1998–1999
2008 deaths
People from Purba Medinipur district